Viktoria Forst was a German association football club from the city of Forst (Lausitz), Brandenburg. It was established in 1901 and played in the regional Südostdeutschland division.



History
In 1920 Viktoria advanced to the league final where they were beaten 2:6 by Vereinigte Breslauer Sportfreunde. The two clubs met again in the final of the 1920–21 season and the Breslau side repeated their victory (2:1).

Forst exacted a measure of revenge the following season when they beat Breslau 6:1 in a contest to determine who would advance to the German national playoffs. However, they lost to Breslau (0:0, 7:3) in contesting the Südost division title. In later national level play Viktoria were put out in a quarterfinal match versus Norden-Nordwest Berlin (0:1). The team remained competitive through the 1920s claiming their only title win in 1925 before being eliminated from the national playoffs by Schwarz-Weiß Essen in an eighth-final contest (1:2). After a third divisional title loss to Breslau (1:3) in 1926, Viktoria made another early exit from the national stage, this time falling to SpVgg Fürth (0:5) which was at the time one of the country's dominant sides.

Forst stumbled its way through to the end of the decade and on into the early 1930s, making just one more appearance in the regional playoffs before fading from sight. The club disappeared following World War II.

Honours
 South Eastern German champions: 1922, 1925

References

Das deutsche Fußball-Archiv historical German domestic league tables 

Football clubs in Germany
Defunct football clubs in Germany
Viktoria
Association football clubs established in 1901
Defunct football clubs in Brandenburg
1901 establishments in Germany
1945 disestablishments in Germany
Association football clubs disestablished in 1945